Bower was a railway station located near Loch Scarmclate, Highland between Halkirk and Wick.

The station opened on 28 July 1874. It was one of a number of smaller stations on the Far North Line which were closed in 1960.

References

External links 
RAILSCOT on Sutherland and Caithness Railway
RAILSCOT page on Bower

Disused railway stations in Caithness
Former Highland Railway stations
Railway stations in Great Britain opened in 1874
Railway stations in Great Britain closed in 1960